Brigade Commander Ivanov is a 1923 Soviet silent comedy film directed by Aleksandr Razumny. It was released in the United States as Beauty and the Bolshevik.

Plot
People cheerfully greet the brigade red troopers who have arrived in the village to rest. As Brigade Commander Ivanov comes to stay in the house of the priest he falls in love with his daughter. Their marriage plans are hindered by religious prejudices as the priest's daughter insists on the wedding to be in the church ...

Cast
 Pyotr Leontyev as Brigade Commander Ivanov
 N. Belyayev as priest
 Mariya Blyumental-Tamarina priest's wife
 Olga Tretyakova as Olympiada, priest's daughter
 G. Volkonskaya as baker of communion bread
 Maria Arnazi-Borshak as komsomol member
 Vsevolod Massino as komsomol member
 Leonid Konstantinovskiy as komsomol member

References

Bibliography 
 Christie, Ian & Taylor, Richard. The Film Factory: Russian and Soviet Cinema in Documents 1896-1939. Routledge, 2012.

External links 
 

1923 films
1923 comedy films
Soviet comedy films
Russian comedy films
Soviet silent feature films
1920s Russian-language films
Films directed by Aleksandr Razumnyj
Soviet black-and-white films
Russian black-and-white films
Silent comedy films